The AN/SPQ-11 Cobra Judy was a PESA radar found on the  missile range instrumentation ship.

It was used for space tracking, ballistic missiles tracking and other instrumentation. Cobra Judy was the sea component of the COBRA program for monitoring missile launches and outer space. Cobra Judy was replaced by the Cobra Judy Replacement (CJR) in April 2014.

Replacement
The Cobra Judy Platform,  was taken out of service and stricken from the Naval Vessel Register March 31, 2014.  On 31 March 2014, the Cobra Judy Replacement program, aboard  reached initial operational capability (IOC). According to the Naval Sea Systems Command (NAVSEA), the U.S. Air Force also assumed operational and sustainment responsibilities for the ship.

See also

, platform for Cobra King, the Cobra Judy Replacement 
Cobra Dane
Cobra Ball
Cobra Eye

References

External links
Cobra Judy@FAS

 

Radio frequency antenna types
Sea radars
Military radars of the United States
Cobra radars
Antennas (radio)